The EMI Songbook Series is a series of 10 compact disc compilation albums released by EMI in 1998 - 1999.  Each disc features songs specifically chosen by a notable cult figure from 20th century popular culture.  The sleeve work for each disc frequently includes essays, illustrations or other contributions from the featured individual.  Clive Barker compiled a CD for this series which included music from Danny Elfman, Diamanda Galás... etc.  Hunter S. Thompson and Robert Crumb provided two of the most acclaimed compilations in the series.

Albums

 Hunter S. Thompson - Where Were You When the Fun Stopped?
 Iain Banks - Personal Effects
 Gerry Anderson - Evocation
 Clive Barker - Being Music
 Gilbert Shelton - Honky Soul, Race Music, Hard Bop & Anachronic Jazz
 Peter Bagge - Rockin' Poppin' Favorites
 Ralph Steadman - I Like It
 Robert Crumb - That's What I Call Sweet Music
 Savage Pencil - The Antiquack -  Dead Duck Selection
 Ivor Cutler - Cute, (H)ey?

Hunter S. Thompson's selections 
Hunter S. Thompson's compilation album is titled Where Were You When the Fun Stopped? It contains eighteen tracks, listed below.

 Ballad of Thunder Road - Robert Mitchum
 I Smell a Rat - Howlin' Wolf
 Spirit in the Sky - Norman Greenbaum
 The Hula Hula Boys - Warren Zevon
 Maggie May - Rod Stewart
 The Wild Side of Life/It Wasn't God Who Made Honky Tonk Angels - Hank Thompson, Tanya Tucker, Kitty Wells
 Will the Circle Be Unbroken - Nitty Gritty Dirt Band
 Mr. Tambourine Man - Bob Dylan
 Walk on the Wild Side - Lou Reed
 If I Had a Boat - Lyle Lovett
 Stars on the Water - Rodney Crowell
 Carmelita - Flaco Jimenez, Dwight Yoakam
 Why Don't We Get Drunk - Jimmy Buffett
 American Pie - Don McLean
 White Rabbit - Jefferson Airplane
 The Weight - The Band
 Melissa - The Allman Brothers Band
 Battle Hymn of the Republic - Herbie Mann

References

See: http://www.thestranger.com/seattle/why-artists-should-stick-to-art/Content?oid=1135

Compilation album series
EMI Records compilation albums